The Voice of Marty Bell – The Quartet of Don Elliott is an album by American jazz trumpeter Don Elliott's Quartet with vocalist Marty Bell which was recorded in 1956 for the Riverside label.

Reception

Allmusic awarded the album 3 stars.

Track listing
 "I Didn't Know What Time It Was" (Lorenz Hart, Richard Rodgers) - 2:33
 "I Thought About You" (Johnny Mercer, Jimmy Van Heusen) - 3:03
 "Moonlight in Vermont" (John Blackburn, Karl Suessdorf) - 3:51
 "The Girl Next Door" (Ralph Blane, Hugh Martin) - 3:16
 "According to Moyle" - 3:27  
 "S'posin'" (Paul Denniker, Andy Razaf) - 2:57  
 "This Can't Be Love" (Hart, Rodgers) - 2:02
 "The Love of My Life" - 3:00
 "I Found a New Baby" (Jack Palmer, Spencer Williams) - 4:57 
 "You Go To My Head" (J. Fred Coots, Haven Gillespie) - 3:26  
 "September Song" (Kurt Weill, Maxwell Anderson) - 3:11    
 "Me and You" (Ernie Wilkins) - 2:10

Personnel 
Marty Bell - vocals
Don Elliott - vibraphone
Bob Corwin - piano 
Vinnie Burke - bass 
Jimmy Campbell - drums

References 

1956 albums
Don Elliott albums
Albums produced by Orrin Keepnews
Riverside Records albums